Kurt Wimmer (born 1964) is an American screenwriter, film producer and film director.

Biography
He attended the University of South Florida and graduated with a BFA degree in Art History. He then moved to Los Angeles, where he worked for 12 years as a screenwriter before directing the 2002 film Equilibrium.  In numerous interviews, he cites Equilibrium as his directorial debut and first film, although his actual directorial debut was the 1995 action film One Tough Bastard starring Brian Bosworth and Bruce Payne. However, Equilibrium was his first theatrically released film.

Filmography

References

External links
 
10 Questions with Kurt Wimmer

1964 births
American film directors
American male screenwriters
Science fiction film directors
Living people
University of South Florida alumni
Place of birth missing (living people)
American people of German descent